The 1990 U.S. Women's Open  was the 45th U.S. Women's Open, held July 12–15 at the Riverside Course of Atlanta Athletic Club in Johns Creek, Georgia, a suburb northeast of Atlanta.

Defending champion Betsy King became the fifth of seven to win consecutive titles, one stroke ahead of runner-up Patty Sheehan, the leader after each of the first three rounds.
Rains delayed the completion of each of the first two rounds until the following day; the final two rounds were played on Sunday.

Past champions in the field

Source:

Round summaries

First round
Thursday, July 12, 1990
Friday, July 13, 1990

Source:

Second round
Friday, July 13, 1990
Saturday, July 14, 1990

Source:

Third round
Sunday, July 15, 1990 (morning)

Source:

Final round
Sunday, July 15, 1990 (afternoon)

Source:

References

External links
U.S. Women's Open - past champions - 1990
Atlanta Athletic Club: official site

U.S. Women's Open
Golf in Georgia (U.S. state)
Sports competitions in Georgia (U.S. state)
Johns Creek, Georgia
Women's sports in Georgia (U.S. state)
U.S. Women's Open
U.S. Women's Open
U.S. Women's Open
U.S. Women's Open